Walter Herbert "Happy" Harnott (September 24, 1909 in Montreal, Quebec — January 8, 1977) was a Canadian professional ice hockey player who played six games in the National Hockey League during the 1933–34 season, with the Boston Bruins. The rest of his career, which lasted from 1931 to 1945, was spent in various minor leagues.

Career statistics

Regular season and playoffs

External links
 

1909 births
1977 deaths
Anglophone Quebec people
Boston Bruins players
Boston Cubs players
Calgary Tigers players
Canadian ice hockey left wingers
Montreal Royals (QSHL) players
Omaha Knights (AHA) players
St. Louis Flyers (AHA) players
St. Paul Saints (AHA) players
Ice hockey people from Montreal
Syracuse Stars (IHL) players